Drejø is a Danish island south of Funen with 72 inhabitants, located in Svendborg municipality. A ferry plies between Svendborg, Skarø and Drejø.

Islands of Denmark
Geography of Svendborg Municipality